Qarquluq, also rendered as Qarqaluq or Qarqoloq or Karqalak or Karghuluk, also known as Ghar Gholoon, may refer to:
 Qarquluq-e Olya
 Qarquluq-e Sofla